The 1978 Berwick and East Lothian by-election was a by-election held for the House of Commons constituency of Berwick and East Lothian in Scotland on 26 October 1978. It was one of two UK parliamentary by-elections held on that day, and was won by the Labour Party candidate John Home Robertson.

Vacancy 
The seat had become vacant when the Labour Member of Parliament (MP), John Mackintosh had died at the age of 48 on 30 July 1978. He had held the seat since the October 1974 general election, having previously been MP for the seat between 1966 and the February 1974 election.

Candidates 
The Labour candidate was 29-year-old John Home Robertson, a farmer who had been a member of Berwickshire District Council since 1974. The Conservative Party candidate was Margaret Marshall.  The Liberals selected Tam Glen.

The Scottish National Party (SNP) fielded Isobel Lindsay. The SNP national leadership chose her as the candidate, which part rules entitled them to do, but tension arose locally from the choice not to endorse the person who the local SNP organisation had selected to fight the next general election.

On the eve of the poll the Conservatives, including Margaret Marshall, reportedly had high hopes of victory and the Glasgow Herald predicted that failure to win the seat would be 'seen as in many quarters as an unmitigated disaster' for the Conservative Party in Scotland. Labour however felt the SNP vote would be reduced with many SNP voters switching to them. John Home Robertson talked of making the seat safe for Labour, but others in the party were described as being 'wary of their chances'. Isobel Lindsay expected to increase the SNP vote, while Tam Glen also was confident that the Liberal vote would rise.

Result 
The result was a victory for Robertson, with an increased majority of 3,112 votes. This was well against the general trend of by-elections in the 1974-79 Parliament, which had been against Labour. It also saw a decline in the SNP vote, continuing a trend at a few other elections earlier in the year.

Robertson held the seat until its abolition for the 1983 general election, when he was returned for the new East Lothian constituency. He went on to represent the Scottish Parliament constituency of East Lothian.

Votes

See also
Berwick and East Lothian constituency
List of United Kingdom by-elections (1950–1979)
1978 Pontefract and Castleford by-election

References 

By-elections to the Parliament of the United Kingdom in Scottish constituencies
Berwick and East Lothian by-election
1970s elections in Scotland
Berwick and East Lothian by-election
Politics of East Lothian
Politics of the Scottish Borders
Berwick and East Lothian by-election